Josip Katalinski (12 May 1948 – 9 June 2011) was a Bosnian professional football manager and player.

Club career
Katalinski's career began in a small club Igman based in Ilidža, a suburb of Sarajevo. He was spotted there in 1964 by Željezničar coaches who offered a move to their club's youth system. He accepted the offer immediately and one year later made his first team debut. Katalinski played for Željezničar until 1975, making more than 250 league appearances and, although a defender, scoring 32 league goals. In total, he played more than 350 games for Željezničar, scoring more than 100 goals. He was a part of the team that won the Yugoslav First League in the 1971–72 season.

Katalinski decided to go abroad in 1975. Subsequently, he signed a contract with French Ligue 1 club Nice. He played 150 games for Nice before deciding end his career in 1978 at only the age of 30 because of a severe injury.

International career
As a youngster, Katalinski started playing for junior team of SR Bosnia and Herzegovina, and later for the Yugoslav junior national team (12 caps) and Under-21 national team (18 caps). In 1972, he made his debut for the senior Yugoslav national team. He collected 41 caps and scored 10 goals.

One of the most famous moments of his career was a 1974 FIFA World Cup qualification play-off match against Spain at Waldstadion in Frankfurt. Katalinski scored the only goal of the game that secured Yugoslavia a place at the 1974 FIFA World Cup and instantly became a hero of the nation. He was part of the Yugoslav 1974 FIFA World Cup and UEFA Euro 1976 squads. His final international was a May 1977 FIFA World Cup qualification match against Romania.

Postplaying career
Katalinski worked as a youth coordinator for the Football Association of Bosnia and Herzegovina. He was an educated football manager and had also graduated in physical education. He worked as a coach in several clubs and one time he was vice-president of his favourite Željezničar.

During 1998, he was also the manager of Bosnian Premier League club Čelik Zenica.

Death and memorial
On 9 June 2011, Katalinski died at the age of 63 in Sarajevo after a long and hard battle with an illness. In his memory, the Football Association of Bosnia and Herzegovina has been organizing the Memorial tournament Josip Katalinski-Škija for U17 teams since June 2012.

Honours

Player
Željezničar
Yugoslav First League: 1971–72

Individual
Awards 
Yugoslav Footballer of the Year: 1974

References

External links

Josip Katalinski at Soccerway

1948 births
2011 deaths
Footballers from Sarajevo
Croats of Bosnia and Herzegovina
Association football defenders
Association football midfielders
Yugoslav footballers
Yugoslavia international footballers
1974 FIFA World Cup players
UEFA Euro 1976 players
FK Željezničar Sarajevo players
OGC Nice players
Yugoslav First League players
Ligue 1 players
Yugoslav expatriate footballers
Expatriate footballers in France
Yugoslav expatriate sportspeople in France
Bosnia and Herzegovina football managers
NK Čelik Zenica managers